The Wild, Wild Rose is a 1960 Hong Kong film directed by Wong Tin-lam.  The plot and some of the songs are from the opera Carmen.

Cast and roles
 Grace Chang as Deng Sijia, nicknamed "The Wild Rose"
 Chang Yang as Liang Hanhua
 Auyeung Sa-fay as Hanhua's Mother
 Lui Tat as Old Wang
 Wong Loy as Shao Xueli
 Lau Yan-kap as Fatty Lin
 Ma Lik as Old Tian
 Ma Hsiao-nung as Old Wang's Wife
 Sum Wan as Li Meimei
 So Fung as Wu Suxin
 Tang Ti as Sijia's Husband
 Tien Ching as Xiao Liu

Music 

Reception

Twenty-first Century Revival and International Recognition 

The film was revived on the English language film festival circuit from 2005. Grace Chang's performance has been particularly praised, "irresistible in her interpretation of the Carmen role" and "a marvel, with a voice that’s playful and virtuosic and a personality that can be wickedly funny or heartbreaking at the flip of a switch".

References

External links
 
 

Hong Kong romantic drama films
1960 romantic drama films
1960s Mandarin-language films
Films based on Carmen
Films set in Hong Kong
Films shot in Hong Kong
1960 films
Films directed by Wong Tin-lam
Hong Kong black-and-white films